Straight to the Heart may refer to:

 Straight to the Heart (Crystal Gayle album), 1986
 "Straight to the Heart" (song), the title track
 Straight to the Heart (David Sanborn album), 1984, or the title track
Straight to the Heart (1968 film), a Canadian drama film
 Straight to the Heart (2016 film), a Filipino drama-comedy film
 Straight to the Heart (game show), a dating game show hosted by Michael Burger
 "Straight to the Heart", a song by Battle Beast from the album Bringer of Pain
 "Straight to the Heart", an episode of the TV series Grey's Anatomy
 "Straight to the Heart", an episode of the TV series Hunter

See also
 "Straight to My Heart", a song by Sting from the album ...Nothing Like the Sun
 "Straight to Heart" (Code Lyoko episode)
 Straight for the Heart, a 1988 film by Léa Pool
 Straight from the Heart (disambiguation)